Coonan is a surname. Notable people with the surname include:

 Helen Coonan (born 1947), Australian politician
 Donal Coonan (born 1981), British internet personality and television presenter
 James Coonan (born 1946), Irish-American gangster
 Daniel Coonan (born 1974), English stage and television actor
 Walter Coonan (1853–1926), Australian actor